Qatar participated in the 2010 Asian Para Games, the first multi-sport event for athletes with a physical disability to run parallel to an edition of the Asian Games. It was held two weeks after the conclusion of the 2010 Asian Games in Guangzhou, China, from 13 to 19 December 2010.

Qatar won a single bronze medal and finished in thirtieth place in the medal table, tied with Myanmar.

Disability classifications
All general rules and guidelines of the Asian Paralympic Committee (APC) are consistent with the rules and norms of the International Paralympic Committee (IPC). According to APC, all the sports in the Asian Para Games must follow the rules of the IPC. 

As in the Paralympic Games, every participant at the Asian Para Games was grouped into one of five categories according to their disability: amputation, cerebral palsy, wheelchair athletes, visual impairment, and les autres, any physical disability that does not fall under one of the other categories. Each Asian Para Games sport then has its own classifications, dependent upon the specific physical demands of competition.

Competitors
The Qatari delegation included eleven athletes, all male, participating in four different sports.  Qatar had sent 64 women to take part in the Asian Games, but in this Games it was the one of three nations that sent no female athlete, the other two being Saudi Arabia, which has an only-men policy in sports, and Palestine. The athletics contingent was the largest, with seven athletes.

Medalist
Mohammed Hadi Aljoaidi, a club thrower, was the only Qatari athlete who succeeded in winning a medal. He won a bronze medal with his personal best in the men's club throw - F31/32/51 event of athletics, held on 17 December 2010 in the Aoti Main Stadium, a main venue of the Games.

Results by event

Athletics

Men—Field

Boccia

Powerlifting

In powerlifting, Qatar sent only one athlete– Ali Abdulla M A Mohamed, who participated in the +100 category. Mohamed did not lift any weight due to DNS (Did Not Start). In this event, Siamand Rahman of Iran broke the world record after lifting a total weight of 290 kg.

Table tennis

Notes and references
Notes
 
 All other NPCs sent at least one woman athlete, out of which only six NPCs failed to achieve any medal in an any women's event.

References

Bibliography

2010 in Qatari sport
Nations at the 2010 Asian Para Games
Qatar at the Asian Para Games